John Badcock may refer to:

John Badcock (rower) (1903–1976), British Olympic rower 
John Badcock (artist) (born 1952), New Zealand artist
John Badcock (cricketer) (1883–1940), Hampshire cricketer
John Badcock (writer), unidentified English sporting writer who published between 1816 and 1830